Dr. Azad Zaman (1973/1974 – 4 March 2021) was an Indian Bengali politician, doctor and social worker. He was the former member of the Meghalaya Legislative Assembly for the Rajabala constituency in West Garo Hills district.

Life
Azad Zaman was born in 1974, to a Bengali Muslim family in Meghalaya. He was the son of Alhaj Surat Zaman. He was a medical practitioner who later joined the government service. His wife is a teacher by profession, and they lived in Bowabari, PO New Bhaitbari, PS Phulbari in the West Garo Hills. 

He competed in the 2013 Meghalaya Legislative Assembly election as an independent politician for Rajabala but lost to Ashahel Shira. He later joined the Indian National Congress party, and defeated Shira in the 2018 Meghalaya Legislative Assembly election.

Death
He died on 4 March 2021, due to cardiac arrest, aged 47. He left behind a wife, two daughters and a son.

References 

1970s births
2021 deaths
Indian National Congress politicians from Meghalaya
Meghalaya MLAs 2018–2023
Year of birth missing
21st-century Bengalis
20th-century Bengalis
People from West Garo Hills district